Filipinos in the Netherlands comprise migrants from the Philippines to the Netherlands and their descendants living there. According to Dutch government statistics, 16,719 persons of first or second-generation Philippine background lived in the Netherlands in 2011. Though Filipinos live throughout the country, Amsterdam and Rotterdam are homes to the largest Filipino communities.

Migration history and motivations
The first Filipina to marry and settle came in 1947 to work in a hospital. In the 1960s, a larger number of Filipinos arrived to work in hospitals in Leiden and Utrecht, as well as a clothing factory in Achterhoek. Since then, most Filipinos went to the Netherlands as contract workers, higher-education students, or medical workers. Partly because of the large number of Filipinos living in the Netherlands, in 2009 KLM increased the number of direct flights to Ninoy Aquino International Airport (in Manila) to seven per week, and seven per week amongst other Filipino airports.

Every day, roughly 300–500 Filipino seamen pass through Dutch ports. One-third of the au pairs in the Netherlands (1,500) are Filipinas. In addition, about 500 Filipinos work on oil rigs in the North Sea. More than 80 Filipino students attend Dutch universities pursuing Masters or Doctorate degrees.

Community organisations
The first Filipino organisation in the Netherlands, Philippine Nurses Association of the Academisch Ziekenhuis in Leiden, was created in 1965. After this, other organisations such as the Dutch-Philippine Association and Dutch-Philippine Club were formed. In 1999 there were more than 20 such organisations in the Netherlands.

There are two major Philippine publications in the Netherlands, the Philippine Digest and the Munting Nayon.

Notable people

Paul Mulders, footballer
Jason de Jong, footballer
Jose Maria Sison, Filipino Communist politician in exile in the Netherlands; called a "person supporting terrorism" by the U.S. and the European Union
Laidback Luke, Filipino-Dutch DJ and producer

See also 
 Netherlands–Philippines relations

References

External links
Federation of Filipino Organizations in the Netherlands 

Asian diaspora in the Netherlands
N
Ethnic groups in the Netherlands
 
Filipino expatriates in the Netherlands